Sichuan pepper, also known as Szechuan pepper, Szechwan pepper, Chinese prickly ash, Chinese pepper, Mountain pepper, and mala pepper, is a spice commonly used in Sichuan cuisine in China, and in Thakali cuisine in Nepal. Despite its name, Sichuan pepper is not closely related to black pepper or chili peppers. It is made from plants of the genus Zanthoxylum in the family Rutaceae, which includes citrus and rue.

When eaten, Sichuan pepper produces a tingling, numbing effect due to the presence of hydroxy-alpha sanshool. The spice has the effect of transforming other flavors tasted together or shortly after. It is used in Sichuan dishes such as mapo doufu and Chongqing hot pot, and is often added together with chili peppers to create a flavor known as málà.

Species and cultivars

Sichuan peppers have been used for culinary and medicinal purposes in China for centuries with numerous Zanthoxylum species called huājiāo (lit. "flower pepper"). Commonly used sichuan peppers in China include hónghuājiāo, or red Sichuan peppercorns, which are harvested from Zanthoxylum bungeanum, and qīnghuājiāo or májiāo, green Sichuan peppercorns, harvested from Zanthoxylum armatum. Fresh green Sichuan peppercorns are also known as téngjiāo.  Red Sichuan pepper is typically characterized as stronger-tasting, while green Sichuan pepper is milder but fragrant and has a stronger numbing effect. Over the years, Chinese farmers have cultivated multiple strains of these two varieties. Zanthoxylum simulans, known as Chinese-pepper or flatspine prickly-ash, is the source of another red Sichuan peppercorn.

Zanthoxylum armatum is found throughout the Himalayas, from Kashmir to Bhutan, as well as in Taiwan, Nepal, China, Philippines, Malaysia, Japan, and Pakistan, and is known by a variety of regional names, including timur in Nepali and Hindko, yer ma in Tibetan and thingye in Bhutan.

Other Zanthoxylum spices 

Zanthoxylum gilletii is an African variety of genus Zanthoxylum used to produce spice uzazi. Similarly, other Zanthoxylum species are harvested for spice and season production in a number of cultures and culinary traditions.  These spices include andaliman, chopi, sancho, sanshō, teppal, and tirphal.

Culinary uses
Sichuan pepper is an important spice in Chinese, Nepali, Kashmiri, Tibetan, and Bhutanese cookery of the Himalayas. Sichuan pepper has a citrus-like flavor and induces a tingling numbness in the mouth, akin to a 50-hertz vibration, due to the presence of hydroxy-alpha sanshool. Food historian Harold McGee describes the effect of sanshools thus:

Chinese cuisine
While whole, green, freshly picked Sichuan pepper may be used in cooking, the dried Sichuan pepper is more commonly used. Once dried, the shiny black seeds inside the husk are discarded (they are hard and tasteless), along with any stems; the husk is what we know as Sichuan pepper or peppercorn.

The peppercorn may be used whole or finely ground, as it is in five-spice powder. Ma la sauce (literally "numbing and spicy"), common in Sichuan cooking, is a combination of Sichuan pepper and chili pepper, and it is a key ingredient in Chongqing hot pot. Sichuan pepper is also occasionally used in pastries such as Jiāo Yán Bǐng. 

Sichuan pepper is also available as an oil (marketed as either "Sichuan pepper oil", "Bunge prickly ash oil", or "huajiao oil"). Sichuan pepper infused oil can be used in dressing, dipping sauces, or any dish in which the flavor of the peppercorn is desired without the texture of the peppercorns themselves.

Hua jiao yan is a mixture of salt and Sichuan pepper, toasted and browned in a wok, and served as a condiment to accompany chicken, duck, and pork dishes.

The leaves of the sichuan pepper tree are also used in soups and fried foods.

Other regions
One Himalayan specialty is the momo, a dumpling stuffed with vegetables, cottage cheese, or minced yak or beef, and flavored with Sichuan pepper, garlic, ginger, and onion. In Nepal, the mala flavor is known as timur (टिमुर).

Medicinal uses
In Traditional Chinese Medicine, Zanthoxylum bungeanum has been used as a herbal remedy. It is listed in the Pharmacopoeia of the People's Republic of China and is prescribed for ailments such as various as abdominal pains, toothache, and eczema. However, Szechuan pepper has no indications or accepted case for use in evidence-based medicine. Research has revealed that Z. bungeanum can have analgesic, anti-inflammatory, antibacterial, and antioxidant effects in model animals and cell cultures. In rabbits, Z. armatum was experimentally investigated for its potential use in treating gastrointestinal, respiratory, and cardiovascular disorders.

Phytochemistry
Important compounds of various Zanthoxylum species include:
Zanthoxylum fagara (Central & Southern Africa, South America) — alkaloids, coumarins (Phytochemistry, 27, 3933, 1988)
Zanthoxylum simulans (Taiwan) — Mostly beta-myrcene, limonene, 1,8-cineole, Z-beta-ocimene (J. Agri. & Food Chem., 44, 1096, 1996)
Zanthoxylum armatum (Nepal) — linalool (50%), limonene, methyl cinnamate, cineole
Zanthoxylum rhetsa (India) — Sabinene, limonene, pinenes, para-cymene, terpinenes, 4-terpineol, alpha-terpineol. (Zeitschrift f. Lebensmitteluntersuchung und -forschung A, 206, 228, 1998)
Zanthoxylum piperitum (Japan [leaves]) — citronellal, citronellol, Z-3-hexenal (Bioscience, Biotechnology, and Biochemistry, 61, 491, 1997)
Zanthoxylum acanthopodium (Indonesia) — citronellal, limonene

Historic US import ban
From 1968 to 2005, the United States Food and Drug Administration banned the importation of Sichuan peppercorns because they were found to be capable of carrying citrus canker (as the tree is in the same family, Rutaceae, as the genus Citrus). This bacterial disease, which is very difficult to control, could potentially harm the foliage and fruit of citrus crops in the U.S. The import ban was only loosely enforced until 2002.

Starting in 2007, the USDA no longer required peppercorns to be heated, fully ending the import ban on peppercorns.

See also
Acmella oleracea (Sichuan buttons)

References

Citations

Sources 

 
 
  PDF

External links

 Recipes
 Sichuan Bang Bang Chicken
 Dry-fried Sichuan Beef
 Chongqing Chicken With Chilies (La Zi Ji)
 Sichuan Mala Hot Pot
 Tibetan Beef and Sichuan Peppercorn Dumplings ('Sha Momo')
 How to Make Five-spice Powder

Medicinal plants
Zanthoxylum
Sichuan cuisine
Chinese condiments
Peppers
Plants used in traditional Chinese medicine